Stefano Cortinovis (born 25 May 1968) is an Italian racing cyclist. He rode in the 1993 Tour de France.

References

External links
 

1968 births
Living people
Italian male cyclists
Cyclists from Bergamo